These are the singles that reached number one on the Top 100 Singles chart in 1987 as published by Cash Box magazine.

See also
1987 in music
List of Hot 100 number-one singles of 1987 (U.S.)

References
https://web.archive.org/web/20071015034432/http://members.aol.com/_ht_a/randypny4/cashbox/1987.html
http://www.cashboxmagazine.com/archives/80s_files/1987.html
https://web.archive.org/web/20060614052240/http://musicseek.info/no1hits/1987.htm

1987
1987 record charts
1987 in American music